Finden is a surname. Notable people with the surname include:

Edward Francis Finden (1791–1857), British engraver
William Finden (1787–1852), British engraver